Hal Patrick Riney (July 17, 1932 – March 24, 2008) was an American advertising executive.

Biography
Founder of the advertising agency Hal Riney & Partners (now Publicis & Hal Riney), Riney was named #30 on the Advertising Age 100 people of the 20th century. He was inducted into the Advertising Hall of Fame in 2001.

Riney grew up in Longview, Washington. He graduated from the University of Washington in 1954.  After serving two years in the United States Army doing public relations in Italy, he joined BBDO San Francisco, moving from the mail room to head art director and finally creative director in 1968.

In 1970, he hired Paul Williams to write a song for a Crocker Bank commercial, which was later recorded by The Carpenters and became the hit "We've Only Just Begun". In 1976 he joined Ogilvy & Mather, building their West Coast office from scratch. In 1984, Riney created and did voiceover for the noted "Morning in America" and "Bear in the Woods" television commercials for the successful Ronald Reagan 1984 Presidential re-election campaign. After creating the Bartles & Jaymes campaign for E & J Gallo Winery, Riney resigned the account, but soon was awarded the launch campaign for Saturn Corporation. The agency was sold to Publicis in 1998.

Riney died at age 75 in 2008, from cancer, at his home in San Francisco.

References

External links

1932 births
2008 deaths
People from Longview, Washington
University of Washington alumni
Advertising directors
American copywriters
Businesspeople from Seattle
Deaths from cancer in California
Businesspeople from the San Francisco Bay Area
Businesspeople from San Francisco
American male voice actors
20th-century American businesspeople